Acompsia schepleri is a moth of the family Gelechiidae which is endemic to central Turkey. The habitat consists of mountainous areas.

The forewings are light brown, with stripes of black scales between veins. The hindwings are brown grey. The hindwings are grey. Adults have been recorded in mid August.

Etymology
The species is named for Danish lepidopterist Fritz Schepler who collected the type series.

References

Moths described in 2002
Endemic fauna of Turkey
Moths of Asia
Acompsia